Alberta Provincial Highway No. 921 is a designated future north-south highway in central Alberta, Canada.

Route description 
In the south, future Highway 921 will begin at the intersection of Highway 21 and Highway 595 north of the Village of Delburne within Red Deer County. Traveling north, the first segment of Highway 921 will cross the Red Deer River into Lacombe County before ending at Highway 11.

Traveling north, the second segment will end a short distance later at the intersection of Highway 12 and Highway 21.

Major intersections 
The following is a list of the future major intersections along Highway 921 from south to north.

References

External links 
2011 Provincial Highways 500 - 986 Progress Chart by Alberta Transportation.

921